1104 Syringa, provisional designation , is a dark background asteroid from the central regions of the asteroid belt, approximately 23 kilometers in diameter. It was discovered on 9 December 1928, by German astronomer Karl Reinmuth at the Heidelberg-Königstuhl State Observatory in southwest Germany.  The asteroid was named after the flowering plant Syringa (lilac).

Orbit and classification 

Syringa is a non-family asteroid from the main belt's background population. It orbits the Sun in the intermediate asteroid belt at a distance of 1.7–3.5 AU once every 4 years and 3 months (1,558 days; semi-major axis of 2.63 AU). Its orbit has an eccentricity of 0.34 and an inclination of 6° with respect to the ecliptic. For a main-belt asteroid, it has a rather high eccentricity. The body's observation arc begins at Heidelberg on 1 January 1929, three weeks after its official discovery observation.

Physical characteristics 

In the SMASS classification, Syringa is a Xk-subtype that transitions between the X- and the dark and uncommon K-type asteroids. It has also been characterized as an X-type by Pan-STARRS photometric survey, and as a primitive P-type asteroid by the Wide-field Infrared Survey Explorer (WISE).

Rotation period 

In February 2006, a rotational lightcurve of Syringa was obtained from photometric observations at the Calvin–Rehoboth Observatory in New Mexico, United States. Lightcurve analysis gave a well-defined rotation period of 5.1547 hours with a brightness amplitude of 0.27 magnitude.

Diameter and albedo 

According to the surveys carried out by the Infrared Astronomical Satellite IRAS, the Japanese Akari satellite and the NEOWISE mission of NASA's WISE telescope, Syringa measures between 19.711 and 24.30 kilometers in diameter and its surface has a low albedo between 0.031 and 0.045. The Collaborative Asteroid Lightcurve Link derives an albedo of 0.0434 and a diameter of 22.13 kilometers based on an absolute magnitude of 12.3.

Naming 

This minor planet was named after a genus of flowering plants, Syringa, of the family Oleaceae. The most common member of Syringa is Syringa vulgaris (common lilac). The official naming citation was mentioned in The Names of the Minor Planets by Paul Herget in 1955.

Reinmuth's flowers 

Due to his many discoveries, Karl Reinmuth submitted a large list of 66 newly named asteroids in the early 1930s. This list also contained a sequence of 28 asteroids, starting with 1054 Forsytia, that were all named after plants, in particular flowering plants (also see list of minor planets named after animals and plants).

References

External links 
 Asteroid Lightcurve Database (LCDB), query form (info )
 Dictionary of Minor Planet Names, Google books
 Asteroids and comets rotation curves, CdR – Observatoire de Genève, Raoul Behrend
 Discovery Circumstances: Numbered Minor Planets (1)-(5000) – Minor Planet Center
 
 

001104
Discoveries by Karl Wilhelm Reinmuth
Named minor planets
001104
19281209